Whiteside is a small rural community in the Canadian province of Nova Scotia, located in Richmond, Subd. B in Richmond County on Cape Breton Island .

References
Whiteside on Destination Nova Scotia

Communities in Richmond County, Nova Scotia
General Service Areas in Nova Scotia